Sweta Keswani is an Indian actress, dancer and model, who is known for her roles in Hindi TV shows, Bollywood films and TV commercials. She received fame from Indians globally after playing the role of Gudiya Thakkar in the Star Plus series Baa Bahoo Aur Baby. Apart from her Bollywood career she also had a role in U.S. Television series The Blacklist.

Personal life

Keswani started acting in class two with an adaption of Goldilocks and the Three Bears. She attended MMK College in Mumbai and graduated with a degree in commerce. While she was at school, she started Kathak and kept up with it for about 6 years at Sangit Mahabharati institute and later with Guruji Shri Surinder Kaur, whom she idolizes. Later she trained in Jazz dance from Shiamak Davar's.

Keswani is a Soka Gakkai Buddhist and is a leader in the SGI Buddhist community. She has said, "There are many branches of Buddhism but essentially the SGI Buddhist philosophy that I practice is a religion for the 21st century. It is a process of transforming the self by chanting a mantra and through that changing not only ourselves for the better but our environment as well. Chanting gives me the clarity to see what action I should take and how I can make both myself and the people around me happier and more fulfilled."

Since 2020, Keswani has served as the Vice President of River's Edge Theatre Co. in Westchester, NY.

Keswani married American actor Alexx O'Nell in 2008, however the pair divorced in 2011. In October 2012, she married Ken Andino, whom she met in New York City. In August 2013, she gave birth to their daughter.

Career

After doing many TV commercials for industries such as Wall's Ice Cream, Pond's and Fanta, Keswani entered television with shows such as Kahaani Ghar Ghar Kii and Des Mein Niklla Hoga Chand.

Filmography

Films
 Gas Station On the Expressway (2007)
 The Memsahib (2006 English : Worldwide Festival Release) 
 Chor Mandli (2005 Hindi) 
 Love In Nepal (2004 Hindi) 
 Back-up (2013)
 As They Made Us (2022)
 The Beanie Bubble (TBA English)
Bin Bulaye Baraati (2011)

Television

      Arranged Marriage
 2006 Johny Aala Re
 2006 Kyunki Yeh Hai Hasya Kavi Muqabala  
 2005 Parde Ke Peechey
 2004 Bollywood Aur Kya Special
 2002-2004 Arre Deewano Mujhe Pehchano

Theatre
Residence Visa (2007) 
Fragile (2007) 
Now She Says She's God (2005) 
3 Aces (2001)

References

External links

 Official Website

Year of birth missing (living people)
Living people
Actresses from Mumbai
21st-century Indian actresses
Actresses in Hindi cinema
Indian film actresses
Indian television actresses
Indian soap opera actresses
Sindhi people
Actresses in Hindi television
Indian stage actresses
Nichiren Buddhists
Indian Buddhists
21st-century Buddhists